The FAW Welsh Youth Cup is a competition contested by teams affiliated to the Football Association of Wales at Under-19 level.

Previous finals

Winners table

References

Football cup competitions in Wales